The Buffalo Bills are a professional American football team based in the Buffalo metropolitan area. The Bills compete in the National Football League (NFL) as a member club of the league's American Football Conference (AFC) East division. The team plays its home games at Highmark Stadium in Orchard Park, New York. Founded in 1960 as a charter member of the American Football League (AFL), they joined the NFL in 1970 following the AFL–NFL merger. The Bills' name is derived from an All-America Football Conference (AAFC) franchise from Buffalo that was in turn named after western frontiersman Buffalo Bill. Drawing much of its fanbase from Western New York, the Bills are the only NFL team that plays home games in that state. The franchise is owned by Terry and Kim Pegula, who purchased the Bills after the death of original owner Ralph Wilson in 2014.

The Bills won consecutive AFL Championships in 1964 and 1965, the only major professional sports championships from a team representing Buffalo. After joining the NFL, they struggled heavily during the 1970s before they became perennial postseason contenders during the late 1980s to the late 1990s. Their greatest success occurred between 1990 and 1993 when they appeared in a record four consecutive Super Bowls; an accomplishment often overshadowed by them losing each game. From the early 2000s to the mid-2010s, the Bills endured the longest playoff drought of 17 years in the four major North American professional sports, making them the last franchise in the four leagues to qualify for the postseason in the 21st century. They returned to consistent postseason contention by the late 2010s, although the Bills have not returned to the Super Bowl. Alongside the Minnesota Vikings, their four Super Bowl appearances are the most among NFL franchises that have not won the Super Bowl..

Franchise history

The Bills began competitive play in 1960 as a charter member of the American Football League led by head coach Buster Ramsey and joined the NFL as part of the AFL–NFL merger in 1970. The Bills won two consecutive American Football League titles in 1964 and 1965 with quarterback Jack Kemp and coach Lou Saban, but the club has yet to win a league championship since.

Once the AFL–NFL merger took effect, the Bills became the second NFL team to represent the city; they followed the Buffalo All-Americans, a charter member of the league. Buffalo had been left out of the league since the All-Americans (by that point renamed the Bisons) folded in 1929; the Bills were no less than the third professional non-NFL team to compete in the city before the merger, following the Indians/Tigers of the early 1940s and an earlier team named the Bills, originally the Bisons, in the late 1940s in the All-America Football Conference (AAFC).

Following the AFL–NFL merger, the Bills were generally mediocre in the 1970s, but featured All-Pro running back O. J. Simpson. After being pushed to the brink of failure in the mid-1980s, the collapse of the United States Football League and a series of highly drafted players such as Jim Kelly (who initially played for the USFL instead of the Bills), Thurman Thomas, Bruce Smith and Darryl Talley allowed the Bills to rebuild into a perennial contender in the late 1980s through the mid-1990s, a period in which the team won four consecutive AFC Championships; the team nevertheless lost all four subsequent Super Bowls, records in both categories that still stand.

The rise of the division rival New England Patriots under Bill Belichick and Tom Brady, along with numerous failed attempts at rebuilding in the 2000s and 2010s, helped prevent the Bills from reaching the playoffs in seventeen consecutive seasons between 2000 and 2016, a 17-year drought that was the longest active playoff drought in all major professional sports at the time. On October 8, 2014, Buffalo Sabres owners Terry and Kim Pegula received unanimous approval to acquire the Bills during the NFL owners' meetings, becoming the second ownership group of the team after team founder Ralph Wilson. Under head coach Sean McDermott, the Bills broke the playoff drought, appearing in the playoffs for four of the next five seasons. The team earned its first division championship and playoff wins since 1995 during the 2020 season, aided by Brady's departure to Tampa Bay and out of the AFC East as well as the Bills' own development of a core of talent including Josh Allen, Stefon Diggs, and Tre'Davious White.

Logos and uniforms

For their first two seasons, the Bills wore uniforms based on those of the Detroit Lions at the time. Ralph Wilson had been a minority owner of the Lions before founding the Bills, and the Bills' predecessors in the AAFC had also worn blue and silver uniforms.

The team's original colors were Honolulu blue, silver and white, and the helmets were silver with no striping. There was no logo on the helmet, which displayed the players' numbers on each side.

In 1962, the standing red bison was designated as the logo and took its place on a white helmet. In 1962, the team's colors also changed to red, white, and blue. The team switched to blue jerseys with red and white shoulder stripes similar to those worn by the Buffalo Bisons AHL hockey team of the same era. The helmets were white with a red center stripe. The jerseys again saw a change in 1964 when the shoulder stripes were replaced by a distinctive stripe pattern on the sleeves consisting of four stripes, two thicker inner stripes and two thinner outer stripes all bordered by red piping. By 1965, red and blue center stripes were put on the helmets.

The Bills introduced blue pants worn with the white jerseys in 1973, the last year of the standing buffalo helmet. The blue pants remained through 1985. The face mask on the helmet was blue from 1974 through 1986 before changing to white.

The standing bison logo was replaced by a blue charging one with a red slanting stripe streaming from its horn. The newer emblem, which is still the primary one used by the franchise, was designed by aerospace designer Stevens Wright in 1974.

In 1984, the helmet's shell color was changed from white to red, primarily to help Bills quarterback Joe Ferguson distinguish them more readily from three of their division rivals at that time, the Baltimore Colts, the Miami Dolphins, and the New England Patriots, who all also wore white helmets at that point. Ferguson said "Everyone we played had white helmets at that time. Our new head coach Kay Stephenson just wanted to get more of a contrast on the field that may help spot a receiver down the field." (The Patriots have worn silver helmets since 1993, the Colts have since been realigned to the AFC South, and in 2019 the New York Jets have since switched back to green-colored helmets, after playing 20 years with white ones.)

In 2002, under the direction of general manager Tom Donahoe, the Bills' uniforms went through radical changes. A darker shade of blue was introduced as the main jersey color, and nickel gray was introduced as an accent color. Both the blue and white jerseys featured red side panels. The white jerseys included a dark blue shoulder yoke and royal blue numbers. The helmet remained primarily red with one navy blue, two nickel, two royal blue, two white stripes, and white face mask. A new logo, a stylized "B" consisting of two bullets and a more detailed buffalo head on top, was proposed and had been released (it can be seen on a few baseball caps that were released for sale), but fan backlash led to the team retaining the running bison logo. The helmet logo adopted in 1974—a charging royal blue bison, with a red streak, white horn and eyeball—remained unchanged.

In 2005, the Bills revived the standing bison helmet and uniform of the mid-1960s as a throwback uniform.

The Bills usually wore the all-blue combination at home and the all-white combination on the road when not wearing the throwback uniforms. They stopped wearing blue-on-white after 2006, while the white-on-blue was not worn after 2007.

For the 2011 season, the Bills unveiled a new uniform design, an updated rendition of the 1975–83 design. This change includes a return to the white helmets with "charging buffalo" logo, and a return to royal blue instead of navy. The set initially featured striped socks, but by 2021, the Bills gradually reduced its usage and began wearing either all-white or all-blue hosiery without stripes in most games.

Buffalo sporadically wore white at home in the 1980s, including all eight home games in 1984,  but stopped doing so beginning in 1987. On November 6, 2011, against the New York Jets, the Bills wore white at home for the first time since 1986. Since 2011, the Bills have worn white for a home game either with their primary uniform or a throwback set.

The Bills' uniform received minor alterations as part of the league's new uniform contract with Nike. The new Nike uniform was unveiled on April 3, 2012.

On November 12, 2015, the Bills and the New York Jets became the first two teams to participate in the NFL's Color Rush uniform initiative, with Buffalo wearing an all-red combination for the first time in team history. Like the primary uniforms, the set initially had red socks with white and blue stripes, but in 2020, it was replaced with red socks without stripes.

A notable use of the Bills' uniforms outside of football was in the 2018 World Junior Ice Hockey Championships, when the United States men's national junior ice hockey team wore Bills-inspired uniforms in their outdoor game against Team Canada on December 29, 2017.

On April 1, 2021, the team announced they will wear white face masks during the upcoming season and beyond.

Rivalries
The Bills have rivalries with their three AFC East opponents, and also have had historical rivalries with other teams such as the Baltimore/Indianapolis Colts (a former divisional rival), Kansas City Chiefs, Houston Oilers/Tennessee Titans, Jacksonville Jaguars, and Dallas Cowboys. They also play an annual preseason game against the Detroit Lions.

The Cleveland Browns once shared a rivalry with the Bills' predecessors in the All-America Football Conference. The current teams have a more friendly relationship and have played sporadically since the AFL–NFL merger.

Divisional rivalries

Miami Dolphins

This is often considered Buffalo's most famous rivalry. Though the Bills and Dolphins both originated in the American Football League, the Dolphins did not start playing until 1966 as an expansion team while the Bills were one of the original eight teams. The rivalry first gained prominence when the Dolphins won every match-up against the Bills in the 1970s for an NFL-record 20 straight wins against a single opponent (the Bills defeated the Dolphins in their first matchup of the 1980s). Fortunes changed in the following decades with the rise of Jim Kelly as Buffalo's franchise quarterback, and though Kelly and Dolphins quarterback Dan Marino shared a competitive rivalry in the 1980s and 1990s, the Bills became dominant in the 1990s. Things have since cooled down after the retirements of Kelly and Marino and the rise of the New England Patriots, but Miami remains a fierce rival of the Bills, coming in second place in a recent poll of Buffalo's primary rival, and the two teams have typically been close to each other in win–loss records. Miami leads the overall series 61–54–1 as of 2021, but Buffalo has the advantage in the playoffs at 3–1, including a win in the 1992 AFC Championship Game.

New England Patriots

The rivalry with the New England Patriots began when both teams were original franchises in the American Football League (AFL) prior to the NFL–AFL merger, but did not gain notability until the emergence of New England's Tom Brady in 2001. The teams were very competitive prior to the 2000s. However, the arrival of Patriots quarterback Brady in the early 2000s led to New England dominating the AFC East, including the Bills, for two decades. As a result, the Patriots replaced the Dolphins as Buffalo's most hated rival. The Bills have taken a 6–1 edge since Brady's departure in 2020, which included consecutive AFC East titles from 2020 to 2022 and a series sweep of the Patriots in two of the three years. In 2021, the Bills dominated in a 47–17 victory against the Patriots in the rivalry's first playoff matchup in 59 years, which saw the Bills score a touchdown on every offensive drive throughout the entire game and as such is the only "perfect offensive game" in NFL history. Overall, the Patriots lead the series 77–49–1, but trail the Bills by a 46–45–1 margin without Brady on the field.

The rivalry is also noted for several players being a member of both teams during their careers, including Drew Bledsoe, Doug Flutie, Lawyer Milloy, Brandon Spikes, Scott Chandler, Chris Hogan, Mike Gillislee, and Stephon Gilmore.

New York Jets

The Bills and Jets were both original AFL teams, and both represent the state of New York, though the Jets (since 1984) actually play their games in East Rutherford, New Jersey. While the rivalry represents the differences between New York City and Western New York, it has historically not been as intense as the Bills' rivalries with the Dolphins and Patriots, and the teams' fanbases either have grudging respect or low-key annoyance (stemming more from the broader upstate-downstate tensions than the teams or sport) for each other when the teams are not playing one another. Oftentimes the Bills-Jets rivalry has become characterized by ugly games and shared mediocrity, but it has had a handful of competitive moments. The series heated up recently when former Jets head coach Rex Ryan became the Bills' head coach for two seasons, and had become notable again as Bills quarterback Josh Allen and former Jets quarterback Sam Darnold, both drafted in the same year, maintained a friendly rivalry with one another. Buffalo leads the series 67–56 as of 2021, including a playoff win in 1981.

Other rivalries

Tennessee Titans

The Tennessee Titans (formerly the Houston Oilers) share an extended history with the Bills, both teams being original AFL clubs in 1960 and rivals in that league's East Division before the AFL-NFL merger. Matchups were intense in the 1990s with quarterback Warren Moon leading the Oilers against Jim Kelly's Bills. After both teams failed to meet the same success in the late 2000s to early 2010s, they have returned to consistent playoff contention since 2017, resulting in several high profile games as of late. Memorable playoff moments between the teams include The Comeback, in which the Frank Reich-led Bills overcame a 35–3 deficit to stun the Oilers 41–38 in 1992, and the Music City Miracle, in which the now-Titans scored on a near-last-minute kickoff return with a controversial lateral pass ruling to beat the Bills 22–16 in 1999. The Music City Miracle was notable for being Buffalo's last playoff appearance until 2017. The Titans currently lead the series 30–20.

Jacksonville Jaguars
A new rivalry emerged between the Bills and the Jacksonville Jaguars after former Bills head coach Doug Marrone, who had quit the team after the 2014 season, was hired as a coaching assistant for Jacksonville and eventually rose to become the Jaguars' head coach. The first game between the Marrone led Jaguars was a London game in week 7 of the 2015 season which saw the Jaguars' win 34-31. The most important game of this series was an ugly, low-scoring Wild Card game in 2017 that saw the Jaguars win 10-3. This game is notable as it was the first Bills playoff appearance in 17 seasons. Prior to this, Jacksonville had handed Buffalo its first playoff loss in Bills Stadium in 1996. Following the 2017 wild card game the Bills and Jaguars have met two additional times. The first was a "rematch" game  in week 12 of the 2018 season which saw the Bills win 24-21. During this game trash talk from former Jaguars players such as Jalen Ramsey resulted in a brawl between the teams. The second time was in week 9 of the 2021 season. By now the "point" of the rivalry, Marrone's feud with the Bills organization, and the personal drama between Bills and Jaguars players no longer applied as Marrone had been fired and replaced by Urban Meyer and all the players from the 2017 Jaguars team have since moved on to other teams or retired. Regardless, this game was the seventh largest upset at the time in NFL history which saw the 15.5-point favorite Bills lose 6-9. The current series record is tied at 9-9-0.

Kansas City Chiefs

The Bills and the Kansas City Chiefs were also original teams in the AFL and have had a long history against each other, despite never being in the same division. Buffalo currently leads the series 27–24–1, which has included five playoff meetings, three of which were AFL/AFC championship games; Kansas City won the 1966 AFL Championship game that determined the AFL's representative in the first Super Bowl, going on to face the Green Bay Packers, in addition to the 2020 AFC Championship game that saw the team advance to its second straight Super Bowl appearance, while Buffalo defeated Kansas City in the 1993 AFC championship game to advance to its fourth straight Super Bowl appearance. Each time the Super Bowl participant would end up losing the big game. Despite a lull in the series in the 2000s and 2010s, the rivalry gained attention nonetheless as the Bills and Chiefs met in nine of ten years from 2008 to 2017. After a 2-year hiatus in the series, four high-profile matchups occurred between the Bills and Chiefs in 2020 and 2021, including the aforementioned 2020 championship game and the 2021 Divisional round game, which is now considered one of the greatest playoff games of all time but was also controversial due to the league’s overtime rules. A rivalry between Josh Allen and Chiefs quarterback Patrick Mahomes has also developed, drawing comparisons to Jim Kelly's rivalry with Dan Marino as well as the rivalry between Tom Brady and Peyton Manning.

Playoffs
 1963 AFL Eastern Division Playoff: Boston Patriots 26, Buffalo Bills 8
 1964 AFL Championship: Buffalo Bills 20, San Diego Chargers 7
 1965 AFL Championship: Buffalo Bills 23, San Diego Chargers 0
 1966 AFL Championship: Kansas City Chiefs 31, Buffalo Bills 7
 1974 Divisional Playoffs: Pittsburgh Steelers 32, Buffalo Bills 14
 1980 Divisional Playoffs: San Diego Chargers 20, Buffalo Bills 14
 1981 wild card game: Buffalo Bills 31, New York Jets 27
 1981 Divisional Playoffs: Cincinnati Bengals 28, Buffalo Bills 21
 1988 Divisional Playoffs: Buffalo Bills 17, Houston Oilers 10
 1988 AFC Championship: Cincinnati Bengals 21, Buffalo Bills 10
 1989 Divisional Playoffs: Cleveland Browns 34, Buffalo Bills 30
 1990 Divisional Playoffs: Buffalo Bills 44, Miami Dolphins 34
 1990 AFC Championship: Buffalo Bills 51, Los Angeles Raiders 3
 Super Bowl XXV: New York Giants 20, Buffalo Bills 19
 1991 Divisional Playoffs: Buffalo Bills 37, Kansas City Chiefs 14
 1991 AFC Championship: Buffalo Bills 10, Denver Broncos 7
 Super Bowl XXVI: Washington Redskins 37, Buffalo Bills 24
 1992 AFC Wild Card Round: Buffalo Bills 41, Houston Oilers 38OT
 1992 AFC Divisional Playoffs: Buffalo Bills 24, Pittsburgh Steelers 3
 1992 AFC Championship: Buffalo Bills 29, Miami Dolphins 10
 Super Bowl XXVII: Dallas Cowboys 52, Buffalo Bills 17
 1993 Divisional Playoffs: Buffalo Bills 29, Los Angeles Raiders 23
 1993 AFC Championship: Buffalo Bills 30, Kansas City Chiefs 13
 Super Bowl XXVIII: Dallas Cowboys 30, Buffalo Bills 13
 1995 Wild Card Round: Buffalo Bills 37, Miami Dolphins 22
 1995 Divisional Playoffs: Pittsburgh Steelers 40, Buffalo Bills 21
 1996 Wild Card Round: Jacksonville Jaguars 30, Buffalo Bills 27
 1998 Wild Card Round: Miami Dolphins 24, Buffalo Bills 17
 1999 Wild Card Round: Tennessee Titans 22, Buffalo Bills 16
 2017 Wild Card Round: Jacksonville Jaguars 10, Buffalo Bills 3
 2019 Wild Card Round: Houston Texans 22, Buffalo Bills 19OT
 2020 Wild Card Round: Buffalo Bills 27, Indianapolis Colts 24
 2020 Divisional Playoffs: Buffalo Bills 17, Baltimore Ravens 3
 2020 AFC Championship: Kansas City Chiefs 38, Buffalo Bills 24
 2021 Wild Card Round: Buffalo Bills 47, New England Patriots 17
 2021 Divisional Playoffs: Kansas City Chiefs 42, Buffalo Bills 36OT
 2022 Wild Card Round: Buffalo Bills 34, Miami Dolphins 31
 2022 Divisional Playoffs: Cincinnati Bengals 27, Buffalo Bills 10
Playoff record: 18 wins, 20 losses.

Notable players

Retired numbers
The Buffalo Bills have retired three numbers in franchise history: No. 12 for Jim Kelly, No. 34 for Thurman Thomas and No. 78 for Bruce Smith. Despite the fact that the Bills have retired only three jersey numbers, the team has other numbers no longer issued to any player or in reduced circulation.

Reduced circulation:
 44 Elbert Dubenion, WR, 1960–1968
 66 Billy Shaw, OL, 1961–1969
 83 Andre Reed, WR, 1985–1999 (Lee Evans III wore No. 83 by special permission)

Since the earliest days of the team, the number 31 was not supposed to be issued to any other player. The Bills had stationery and various other team merchandise showing a running player wearing that number, and it was not supposed to represent any specific person, but the 'spirit of the team.' In the first three decades of the team's existence, the number 31 was only seen once: in 1969, when reserve running back Preston Ridlehuber damaged his number 36 jersey during a game, equipment manager Tony Marchitte gave him the number 31 jersey to wear while repairing the number 36. The number 31 was not issued again until 1990 when first round draft choice James (J.D.) Williams wore it for his first two seasons; it has since been returned to general circulation, currently worn as of 2022 by Dean Marlowe.

Number 32 had been withdrawn from circulation, but not retired, after O. J. Simpson. Former owner Ralph Wilson insisted on not reissuing the number, even after Simpson's highly publicized murder case and later robbery conviction. The number was placed back into circulation in 2019 with Senorise Perry wearing the number that year; as of 2022, practice squad cornerback Kyler McMichael uses the number.

Number 15 was historically only issued sparingly after the retirement of Jack Kemp, but was later returned to general circulation. Receiver Jake Kumerow wears the number as of 2021.

Number 1 has also only rarely been used, for reasons never explained. While there is no proper explanation, Tommy Hughitt was a player-coach for the early Buffalo teams in the New York Pro Football League and NFL from 1918 to 1924 and was both a major on-field success and a fixture in Buffalo culture after his retirement as a politician and auto salesman. Hugitt was reported to wear number 1 during this time. Wide receiver Emmanuel Sanders is the most recent Bill to wear the number; prior to his arrival in 2021, it had been 19 years since it had been worn in the regular season, when kicker Mike Hollis wore it in 2002.

Ralph C. Wilson Jr. Distinguished Service Award recipients

Wall of Fame

Pro Football Hall of Fame

All-time first round draft picks

Recent Pro Bowl selections

Coaching staff

Head coaches

Current staff

Current roster

Damar Hamlin injury

On January 2, 2023, Bills safety Damar Hamlin collapsed after tackling Tee Higgins of the Cincinnati Bengals with 5:58 left in the first quarter. Cardiopulmonary resuscitation (CPR) was administered on the field and a defribillator was used. He was transported by ambulance to the University of Cincinnati Medical Center. There he was intubated and listed in critical condition. He was discharged nine days later on January 11. The game against the Bengals was postponed until further notice at 10:01pm by the NFL after communication with the NFLPA. The game was deemed a No Contest by the NFL on January 5.

Radio and television

The Buffalo Bills Radio Network is flagshipped at WGR AM 550 in Buffalo, with sister station WWKB AM 1520 simulcasting all home games. Chris Brown is the team's current play-by-play announcer, having taken over from John Murphy (the announcer from 2003 to 2022 and color commentator most years from 1984 to 2003) after Murphy suffered a stroke. Former Bills center Eric Wood serves as the color analyst.

In 2018, the team signed an agreement with Nexstar Media Group to carry Bills preseason games across its network of stations in the region. As of 2020, WIVB-TV serves as the flagship station of the network, which includes WJET-TV in Erie, WROC-TV in Rochester, WSYR-TV in Syracuse, WUTR in Utica, WETM-TV in Elmira and WIVT in Binghamton. Steve Tasker does color commentary on these games; the play-by-play position is rotated between Andrew Catalon and Rob Stone. WROC-TV reporter Thad Brown is the sideline reporter. Since 2008, preseason games have been broadcast in high definition.

Beginning in the 2016 season, as per a new rights deal which covers rights to the team as well as its sister NHL franchise, the Buffalo Sabres, most team-related programming, including studio programming and the coach's show, was re-located to MSG Western New York—a joint venture of MSG and the team ownership. Preseason games will continue to air in simulcast on broadcast television.

In the event regular-season games are broadcast by ESPN, in accordance with the league's television policies, a local Buffalo station simulcasts the game. From 2014 to 2017, WKBW-TV held the broadcast rights to that contest, with the station having won back the rights to cable games after WBBZ-TV held the rights for 2012 and 2013.

Training camp sites
 1960–1962 Roycroft Inn, East Aurora, New York
 1963–1967 Camelot Hotel, Blasdell, New York
 1968–1980 Niagara University, Lewiston, New York
 1981–1999 State University of New York at Fredonia, Fredonia, New York
 2000–present, St. John Fisher University, Pittsford, New York

Source:

Mascots, cheerleaders and marching band
The Bills' official mascot is Billy Buffalo, an eight-foot-tall, anthropomorphic blue American bison who wears the jersey "number" BB.

The Bills do not have cheerleaders. The Bills operated a cheerleading squad named the Buffalo Jills from 1967 to 1985; from 1986 to 2013, the Jills operated as an independent organization sponsored by various companies. The Jills suspended operations prior to the 2014 season due to legal actions. The Bills and Jills were previously involved in a legal battle, in which the Jills alleged they were employees, not independent contractors, and sought back pay. On March 3, 2022, a settlement was reached where the Bills agreed to pay the Jills $3.5 million, while Cumulus Media paid $4 million in stock options of the company while admitting no wrongdoing.

The Bills are one of six teams in the NFL to designate an official marching band or drumline (the others being the Baltimore Ravens, Washington Commanders, New York Jets, Carolina Panthers and Seattle Seahawks). Since the last game of the 2013 season, this position has been served by the Stampede Drumline, known outside of Buffalo as Downbeat Percussion. The Bills have also used the full marching bands from Attica High School, the University of Pittsburgh and Syracuse University at home games in recent years.

The Bills have several theme songs associated with them. The most popular is a variation of the Isley Brothers hit "Shout", recorded by Scott Kemper, which served as the Bills' official promotional song from 1987 through 1990s. It can be heard at every Bills home game following a field goal or touchdown and at the end of the game if the Bills win. The Bills' unofficial fight song, "Go Bills", was penned by Bills head coach Marv Levy in the mid-1990s on a friendly wager with his players that he will write the song if the team won a particular game.

Supporters

The "Bills Backers" are the official fan organization of the Buffalo Bills. It has over 200 chapters across North America, Europe and Oceania. Also notable is the "Bills Mafia", organized via Twitter beginning in 2010 by Del Reid, Leslie Wille, and Breyon Harris; the phrase "Bills Mafia" had by 2017 grown to unofficially represent the broad community surrounding and encompassing the team as a whole, and players who join the Bills often speak of joining the Bills Mafia. Outsiders often treat the Bills' fan base in derogatory terms, especially since the 2010s, in part because of negative press coverage of select fans' wilder antics. In 2020, the Bills filed to trademark the "Bills Mafia" name.

Bills fans are particularly well known for their wearing of Zubaz zebra-printed sportswear; so much is the association between Bills fans and Zubaz that when a revival of the company opened their first brick-and-mortar storefront, it chose Western New York as its first location. The "wing hat," a hat shaped like a spicy chicken wing (much in the same style as the Green Bay Packers' Cheesehead hats), can also frequently be seen atop Bills fans' heads, having originated as promotional merchandise by the Anchor Bar, the purported inventors of the modern chicken wing as a delicacy. They are also well known for jumping off of elevated surfaces (often cars or RVs) into folding tables during the pre-game tailgate.

Bills fans are noted for their frequent support for charitable causes. After the Bills received help in breaking their 17-year playoff drought on a last-minute Cincinnati Bengals victory, Bills fans crowdfunded the charities of Bengals players Andy Dalton and Tyler Boyd with hundreds of thousands of dollars as a gesture of thanks. Also in 2020, following a November 8 upset win over the Seattle Seahawks led by one of the best career performances by quarterback Josh Allen, news emerged that Allen had elected to take the field after having been given the option to sit out the contest as he had received news of his grandmother's death only the night before. Fans showed support for their team and community by donating nearly $700,000 to the Oishei Children's Hospital, an organization supported by Allen throughout his time in Buffalo. Following the Bills' defeat of the Baltimore Ravens in the 2020–21 NFL playoffs and an injury to Ravens quarterback Lamar Jackson late in that game, Bills fans crowdfunded his favorite charity, Blessings in a Backpack.

The Bills are one of the favorite teams of ESPN announcer Chris Berman, who picked the Bills to reach the Super Bowl nearly every year in the 1990s. Berman often uses the catchphrase "No one circles the wagons like the Buffalo Bills!" Berman gave the induction speech for Bills owner Ralph Wilson when Wilson was inducted into the Pro Football Hall of Fame in 2009.

The Bills were also the favorite team of late NBC political commentator Tim Russert, a South Buffalo native, who often referred to the Bills on his Sunday morning talk show, Meet the Press. (His son, Luke, is also a notable fan of the team.) CNN's Wolf Blitzer, also a Buffalo native, has proclaimed he is also a fan, as has CBS Evening News lead anchor and Tonawanda native Jeff Glor and DNC Chairman Tom Perez.

ESPN anchor Kevin Connors is also a noted Bills fan, dating to his time attending Ithaca College. Actor Nick Bakay, a Buffalo native, is also a well-known Bills fan; he has discussed the team in segments of NFL Top 10. Character actor William Fichtner, raised in Cheektowaga, is a fan, and did a commercial for the team in 2014. In 2015, Fichtner also narrated the ESPN 30 for 30 documentary on the Bills' four Super Bowl appearances, "Four Falls of Buffalo". Former Olympic swimmer Summer Sanders (an in-law to former Bills kicker Todd Schlopy) has professed her fandom of the team. Actor Christopher McDonald, who was raised in Romulus, New York, is a fan of the team.

Persons notable almost entirely for their Bills fandom include Ken "Pinto Ron" Johnson, whose antics while appearing at every Bills home and away game since 1994 earned enough scrutiny that his tailgate parties were banned from stadium property on order of the league; John Lang, an Elvis impersonator who carries a large guitar that he uses as a billboard; Marc Miller, whose professional wrestling promo-style interview with WGRZ prior to Super Bowl XXVII (distinguished by the line "Dallas is going down, Gary!" and picked up at the time by The George Michael Sports Machine) was rediscovered in 2019; and Ezra Castro, also known as "Pancho Billa," a native of El Paso, Texas who wore a large sombrero and lucha mask in Bills colors. Castro was diagnosed with a spinal tumor that had metastasized in 2017; he was invited on stage during the 2018 NFL Draft to read one of the Bills' selections. Castro died on May 14, 2019.

In popular culture
Several former Buffalo Bills players earned a name in politics in the late 20th century after their playing careers had ended, nearly always as members of the Republican Party. The most famous of these was quarterback Jack Kemp, who was elected to the U.S. House of Representatives from Western New York in 1971—two years after his playing career ended and remained there for nearly two decades, serving as the Republican Party nominee for Vice President of the United States under Bob Dole in 1996. Kemp's backup, Ed Rutkowski, served as county executive of Erie County from 1979 to 1987. Former tight end Jay Riemersma, defensive tackle Fred Smerlas and defensive end Phil Hansen have all run for Congress, though all three either lost or withdrew from their respective races. Quarterback Jim Kelly and running back Thurman Thomas have also both been mentioned as potential candidates for political office, although both have declined all requests to date.

See also
 List of American Football League players
 Major North American professional sports teams

Notes

References

External links

 
 Buffalo Bills at the National Football League official website

 
American football in Buffalo, New York
American Football League teams
American football teams in New York (state)
National Football League teams
Pegula Sports and Entertainment
American football teams established in 1960
1960 establishments in New York (state)
Western New York